Shortepa also Shor Tappeh (population 38,500) is one of the 15 districts of Balkh province. Shortepa, a small district in Balkh Province, Afghanistan. It is situated along the Amu Darya river, across the border with Termez, Uzbekistan, and to the east Kaldar. The main village is Shor Tappeh, A  at 274 m altitude.

Economy
The vast majority of villagers work in agriculture on farms along the coast. In the village of Joi Wakil there is a clinic which serves the spars district.

Demographics
According to the 2012-13 census, there are 38,500 people residing in the seven villages. 19,800 or 51.5% of villagers were males and 18,700 or 48.5% were females. With a multi-ethnic and mostly Persian-speaking society. The major ethnic group is the Tajiks with the vast population belonging to them followed by Pashtoons, Uzbek, Hazaras, Turkman, Arab and Baluch. Shortepa also has a small but noticeable population of Kuchis or nomads whose numbers vary in different seasons with numbers going down in the winter and up in the summer.

Villages

Tash Guzar
Hazareh Toghay
Boria Baf
Tokhom Geldi
Arigh Batur
Joi Wakli
Chub Bash

References

External links
Map of Shortepa (PDF)

Districts of Balkh Province